This is a list of Billboard magazine's Top Hot 100 singles of 1971. The Top 100, as revealed in the year-end edition of Billboard dated December 25, 1971, is based on Hot 100 charts from the issue dates of January 2 through November 27, 1971.

See also
1971 in music
List of Billboard Hot 100 number-one singles of 1971
List of Billboard Hot 100 top-ten singles in 1971

References

1971 record charts
Billboard charts